Bestiola may refer to:
 Bestiola, a genus of wasps in the family Aphelinidae, synonym of Proaphelinoides
 Bestiola, a genus of copepods in the family Paracalanidae, synonym of Bestiolina
 Bestiola, a 2008 album by Catalan band Hidrogenesse